Community Bank Bangladesh Limited is one of the newly approved Scheduled Banks of Bangladesh. This bank is fully owned by Bangladesh Police Welfare Trust. Masihul Huq Chowdhury is the CEO and Managing Director of the Bank. The board meetings of the bank is held at the headquarters of Bangladesh Police. The Inspector General of Police, Chowdhury Abdullah Al-Mamun, is the chairman of the bank.

History 
On 23 May 2018, Bangladesh Police Welfare Trust applied for a license from Bangladesh Bank to open a bank named Community Bank Bangladesh Limited. The trust is owned by Bangladesh Police. Bangladesh Bank approved the license application of the Bank in October 2018.  The Bank was officially listed on 4 November 2018. Finance Minister of Bangladesh, Abul Maal Abdul Muhith, criticised Bangladesh Bank for approving Community Bank Bangladesh, Citizens Bank PLC, Bengal Commercial Bank Limited, and People's Bank Limited. He expressed unhappiness as he believed the banks were approved on political considerations.

Community Bank Bangladesh Limited started its operation on 11 September 2019, inaugurated by the Prime Minister of Bangladesh Sheikh Hasina.

In November 2021, Masihul Huq Chowdhury was reappointed the managing director of Community Bank Bangladesh Limited.

Board of directors

See also 

 Shimanto Bank Limited, managed by Border Guards Bangladesh
 Trust Bank Limited, managed by Bangladesh Army
 Ansar-VDP Unnayan Bank, managed by Bangladesh Ansar and the Village Defence Party

References

Banks established in 2018
Banks of Bangladesh
Bangladeshi companies established in 2018